Jerry Rosburg (born November 24, 1955) is an American football coach, who most recently served as the interim head coach for the Denver Broncos of the National Football League (NFL). In 2008, he was hired as assistant head coach/special teams coach for the Baltimore Ravens of the NFL. He was part of the Ravens' coaching staff on the team that won Super Bowl XLVII.

Early life and playing career
He graduated from Fairmont High School in 1974. He then attended North Dakota State University where he played linebacker for the Bison, he graduated in 1978. As a linebacker, Rosburg was named as an All-American selection in 1978.

Coaching career

Early years
In 1979, he became an assistant at Shanley High School. In 1981, he became a graduate assistant coach at Northern Michigan, receiving his master's degree in 1983. He continued at Northern Michigan until taking a position as the linebackers coach at Western Michigan in 1987. In 1992, he moved from Western Michigan to Cincinnati as the linebackers coach. In 1996, he became the secondary coach at Minnesota. In 1997, he moved to Boston College to become the secondary coach. In 1999, he became the outside linebackers and special teams coach at Notre Dame, the team would make the Fiesta Bowl in 2000.

NFL

Cleveland Browns
In 2001, Rosburg was named as the special teams coordinator for the Cleveland Browns of the National Football League (NFL).

Atlanta Falcons
In 2007, following his six-year stint with the Browns, Rosburg was hired as the special teams coordinator for the Atlanta Falcons.

Baltimore Ravens
In 2008, Jerry Rosburg was named as the Assistant Head Coach and Special Teams Coordinator for the Baltimore Ravens of the National Football League (NFL).  In 2012 Rosberg recruited Justin Tucker in as a rookie free agent, who went on to become the #1 field goal kicker in 2013. He won his first Super Bowl title when the Ravens defeated the San Francisco 49ers in Super Bowl XLVII. In 2014 he was named the Special Teams Coordinator and Associate Head Coach for the Baltimore Ravens. The Baltimore Ravens were ranked as the number 1 Special Teams unit in 2015. 
On March 15, 2019, Rosburg announced that he was retiring from coaching. Rosburg coached at the college and professional level for 40 years and finished his career having been with the Baltimore Ravens for eleven seasons.

Denver Broncos
Rosburg was hired by the Denver Broncos in 2022 to serve as an assistant to their new head coach Nathaniel Hackett. On December 26, 2022, following the firing of Hackett, Rosburg was named as the interim head coach of the Broncos. Rosburg went 1–1 in his two games as interim head coach.

Head coaching record

* Interim head coach

References

External links
 Baltimore Ravens bio

1955 births
Living people
North Dakota State Bison football players
American football linebackers
Northern Michigan Wildcats football coaches
Western Michigan Broncos football coaches
Cincinnati Bearcats football coaches
Minnesota Golden Gophers football coaches
Boston College Eagles football coaches
Notre Dame Fighting Irish football coaches
Cleveland Browns coaches
Atlanta Falcons coaches
Baltimore Ravens coaches
People from Fairmont, Minnesota